Life Is Beautiful is a 2022 South Korean musical, road film directed by Choi Kook-hee and starring Yum Jung-ah, Ryu Seung-ryong, Park Se-wan and Ong Seong-wu. It is a musical about Oh Se-yeon (Yum Jung-ah) who asks her husband to help her find her childhood sweetheart as her birthday gift. Both embark on journey to find him. The film had its premiere at 36th Fribourg International Film Festival on March 19, 2022, and was released in theaters on September 28 2022 in South Korea.

Synopsis
The film is a musical drama about a woman Oh Se Yeon (Yum Jung-ah), who makes a strange request to her husband as birthday gift. It is to find her first love from her school days. Her husband Kang Jin-bong (Ryu Seung-ryong) reluctantly joins her on this journey. The journey, full of life and music.

Cast
 Yum Jung-ah as Oh Se-yeon
 Park Se-wan as young Oh Se-yeon
 Ryu Seung-ryong as Kang Jin-bong, husband of Oh Se-yeon
 Ong Seong-wu as Jeong-woo
 Yang Hee-kyung as Dong-tan, landlady
 Park Yeong-gyu as Jin-bong's father 
 Shim Dal-gi as Hyeon-jeong, Se-yeon's childhood friend
 Ha Hyun-sang as Seo Jin, son of Jin Bong and Se Yeon.
 Kim Hye-ok as Jin-bong's mother
 Ko Chang-seok
 Yeom Hye-ran
 Jeon Moo-song
 Shin Shin-ae as Aunt Dong-tan
 Kim Jong-soo
 Kim Sun-young
 Ryu Hyun-kyung
 Kim Da-in as Ye-jin, A daughter full of rebellion.
 Lee Won-hee as dancer
 Yuk Sim-hwan as dancer
 Kang Seung-wan

Production
Theme
The film is a road film in which two people wife and husband wander across the country in search of wife's first love, It has music that fits their stories from childhood to the present. It is the first jukebox musical in South Korea, containing familiar popular songs from the 1970s to 2000s.
Filming
The filming began on October 14, 2019 and it was wrapped up on February 6, 2020.

Release

Life Is Beautiful had its premiere at 36th Fribourg International Film Festival on March 19, 2022.

The film was scheduled to be released in theaters in December 2020, but was postponed due to COVID-19 pandemic. It was released on September 28, 2022.

Accolades

References

External links
 
 
 
 

2022 films
2020s Korean-language films
South Korean drama road movies
South Korean musical drama films
Films about cancer
Films about death
Films about families
Films postponed due to the COVID-19 pandemic
Films set in Busan
Films set in North Chungcheong Province
Films set in Seoul
Films set in South Jeolla Province
Lotte Entertainment films